Shaggy Dog Story is a charity programme for Children in Need, put together by the BBC in 1999 as a sequel to the previous year's Future Generations video (featuring children's programmes), and the great success of 1997's "Perfect Day" charity single. It was first shown on 27 December 1999.

Shaggy Dog Story was dedicated to the BBC's comedy output. It featured various comedians and comic actors (some in character, others as themselves) telling a long-winded shaggy dog story, beginning off with Ronnie Corbett in his trademark armchair, who is most famously known for telling such stories on The Two Ronnies. The story featured a cricket captain who hired a horse for his team, who ends up as a good player but can't run.

A second, shorter story, entitled "Mammals vs. Insects", was also broadcast on 4 January 2000. This story revolved around a football match between the two teams of creatures and featured many of the participants from the other story.

Participants
The participants, in order of appearance, were:

Ronnie Corbett (as himself)
Paul Whitehouse (as The 13th Duke of Wybourne from The Fast Show)
June Whitfield (as herself)
Stephen Fry (as himself)
Richard Wilson (as Victor Meldrew from One Foot in the Grave)
Harry Enfield (as Tim Nice-But-Dim from Harry Enfield's Television Programme)
Ronnie Barker (as Albert Arkwright from Open All Hours)
Charlie Higson (as Bob Fleming from The Fast Show)
Spike Milligan (as himself) 
Neil Morrissey (as Tony Smart from Men Behaving Badly)
Reece Shearsmith (as Edward Tattsyrup from The League of Gentlemen)
Steve Pemberton (as Tubbs Tattsyrup from The League of Gentlemen)
Geoffrey Palmer (as Lionel Hardcastle from As Time Goes By)
Caroline Aherne (as Denise Best from The Royle Family)
Craig Cash (as Dave Best from The Royle Family) 
Jennifer Saunders (as herself)
Dawn French (as herself)
Phil Cornwell (as Michael Caine from Stella Street)
Simon Pegg (as a horse jockey from Big Train)
Mark Heap (as a horse jockey from Big Train)
Kevin Eldon (as a horse jockey from Big Train)
Amelia Bullmore (as a horse jockey from Big Train)
Julia Davis (as a horse jockey from Big Train)
Mark Gatiss (as Hilary Briss from The League of Gentlemen)
Victoria Wood (as Brenda Furlong from dinnerladies)
Ardal O'Hanlon (as George Sunday/Thermoman from My Hero)
Mark Williams (as Patrick Nice from The Fast Show)
Sanjeev Bhaskar (as St John Robinson/Surjit Rabindranath from Goodness Gracious Me)
Meera Syal (as Vanessa Robinson/Veena Rabindranath from Goodness Gracious Me)
Kulvinder Ghir (as Dennis Cooper/Dinesh Kapoor from Goodness Gracious Me)
Nina Wadia (as Charlotte Cooper/Sashi Kapoor from Goodness Gracious Me)
Peter Sallis (as Norman Clegg from Last of the Summer Wine)
Angus Deayton (as himself)
John Thomson (as Louis Balfour from The Fast Show)
John Sessions (as Eileen Huggett from Stella Street)
Paul Kaye (as Bob Slay from Perfect World)
Belinda Lang (as Bill Porter from 2point4 Children)
Gary Olsen (as Ben Porter from 2point4 Children)
Emma Chambers (as Alice Tinker from The Vicar of Dibley)
Craig Charles (as Dave Lister from Red Dwarf)
Chris Barrie (as Arnold Rimmer from Red Dwarf)
Jack Dee (as himself)
Alan Davies (as himself)
John Cleese (voiceover) (as himself)

References

 TVARK promotions page Features the promotion (entitled Serious about Comedy)
 IMDB Article

External links
 TVARK promotions page Features the promotion (entitled Serious about Comedy)

BBC television comedy
Children in Need